The 1977 Grambling State Tigers football team represented Grambling State University as a member of the Southwestern Athletic Conference (SWAC) during the 1977 NCAA Division I football season. The Tigers were led by head coach Eddie Robinson in his 35th year and finished the season with a record of ten wins and one loss (10–1, 6–0 SWAC), as SWAC champions, black college football national champions and with a victory over Temple in the Mirage Bowl. The Tigers offense scored 462 points while the defense allowed 175 points.

Schedule

Team players drafted into the NFL

 Reference:

References

Grambling State
Grambling State Tigers football seasons
Black college football national champions
Southwestern Athletic Conference football champion seasons
Grambling State Tigers football